Palisota barteri is a species of plant in the Commelinaceae family, described in 1862. It is native to western + central Africa.

References

External links

 

barteri
Flora of Africa
Plants described in 1862